Sirwal, also sherwal, saroual, seroual, sarouel or serouel ( (sirwāl), also known, in some contexts, as (a subtype of) Harem pants, are a form of trousers predating Hellenic influence in the Balkans. They are typically worn in Muslim countries, but also extensively in the Polish Commonwealth, in Mallorca, in the Greek countryside, and other places in the Balkans that were influenced by Ottoman Turks prior to World War II. The trousers are not originally an Arab garment but were introduced from Persia to other Mideastern regions. The sirwal is also worn by communities in North India.

The drawstring allows the sirwal to be worn at either the waist or hip level.

Types
It is usually made from cotton, linen, or polyester. Sometimes the cuff features embroidery.

There are two types of sirwal, long and short. Short sarawil are worn by most Saudi men. Men of the Western Region usually wear long sarawil.

Uniforms

The seroual formed part of the standard uniform for the Mameluke squadrons of Napoleon's Imperial Guard, and for the North African zouave, spahi and tirailleur regiments of the French Army from 1830 to 1962. The French Army version of the seroual was notable for being cut so widely that it did not require two separate trouser legs. During the American Civil War a number of volunteer regiments, designated as zouaves, also wore seroual breeches, though these were usually of chasseur design, being simply baggier versions of conventional trousers.

See also

 Pajamas
 Shalwar kameez
 Salwar
 Sharovary

Notes

References

Trousers and shorts
Arabic clothing
Middle Eastern clothing
Lebanese fashion
Islamic male clothing